The 1981 Census of India was the 12th in a series of censuses held in India every decade since 1872. The population of India was counted as 685,184,692 people.

Population by state

Religious demographics
Population trends for major religious groups in India (1981)

See also
Demographics of India

References

External links

Census Of India, 1978
Censuses in India
Political history of India
India